Daniel Reeves may refer to:
 Dan Reeves (1944–2022), American football player and coach
 Dan Reeves (American football executive) (1912–1971), American football owner, member of the Pro Football Hall of Fame
 Danny C. Reeves (born 1957), United States federal judge